Silence Is Golden may refer to:

 "Silence Is Golden" (song), a song recorded by The Four Seasons and The Tremeloes
 Silence Is Golden (film), a 2006 short film by Chris Shepherd
 Man About Town (1947 film), originally Le Silence est d'or (Silence is golden), a 1947 film by René Clair and Robert Pirosh
 Silence Is Golden (EP), an EP by A Thorn For Every Heart
 "Silence Is Golden", a song by Garbage from the album Beautiful Garbage
 Speech is silver, silence is golden, a proverb